The GO 55 class is a series of three floating dry docks of the Marina Militare.
It's fitted with Pellegrini crane GP 3/12/T/H (3.000 kg to 12 m).

Ships

References

External links
 Ships Marina Militare website

Floating drydocks
Ships built in Italy
Auxiliary ships of the Italian Navy